Aurad is a town and municipal council in the Bidar district of Kalyana-Karnataka region of the Indian state of Karnataka. It passes through the National Highway 161A.
It is 42 kilometres (26 mi) from District Headquarters Bidar. The area of Aurad is 1,227.20 km2 having 6 circles, 149 villages and 177 thandas.

Geography
The area of Aurad is 1,227.20 km2 having 6 circles, 149 villages and 177 thandas. Aurad taluka is one of the five talukas of the Bidar District. It is bounded by Maharashtra on the North-west, Bhalki taluka on the south and Telangana in the east. This is the largest taluka in the district.

River 
Manjra is the tributary of Godavari, which enters into Aurad at Horandi and flows as taluka boundary through Sonal, Kalgapur, Hulsur, Khed, Halalli, Nidoda, Nittur, Babli, Bachepalli. Ladha, Koutha(B), Khanapur and at the end it leaves Aurad at Kandgul village.

Climate 
The climate is generally dry and healthy. The average rainfall of the taluka is 840 mm. Average number of rainy days are about 51 days. Though the climate is dry throughout the year, summer months become very hot and the temperature goes as high as 40-43-degree Celsius. The minimum temperature during winter goes as low as 15-10-degree Celsius.

Demographics
As of 2011 Indian Census, Aurad town panchayat had a total population of 19,849, of which 10,058 were males and 9,791 were females. Population within the age group of 0 to 6 years was 2,769. The total number of literates in Aurad was 12,226, which constituted 61.6% of the population with male literacy of 68.7% and female literacy of 54.3%. The effective literacy rate of 7+ population of Aurad was 71.6%, of which male literacy rate was 79.8% and female literacy rate was 63.2%. The Scheduled Castes and Scheduled Tribes population was 6,066 and 1,207 respectively. Aurad had 3810 households in 2011.

Aurad suburb had a population of 4,108, of which 2,056 were males and 2,052 were females, with 494 under the age of seven.

Places of interest
Sri Amareshwar Temple.

Notable people
Bhagwanth Khuba, serving Member of Parliament of the Bidar Lok Sabha constituency since 2014.
Narsingrao Suryawanshi, former Member of Parliament from Bidar. 
Vaijnath Patil, member of the Indian National Congress.
Prabhu Chauhan, serving Minister of Animal Husbandry and Fisheries and Minority Welfare in Government of Karnataka since 2019

References

Cities and towns in Bidar district
Western Chalukya Empire
Chalukya dynasty